Fustius malaysiensis is a moth of the family Erebidae first described by Michael Fibiger in 2010. It is known from western Malaysia.

The wingspan is about 8 mm. The forewing ground colour is yellow brown, although the basal, costal quadrangular patch and terminal area, including fringes are black. The crosslines are indistinct, except the terminal line indicated by black interneural dots. The hindwing is grey and the underside of the forewing is brownish grey, while the underside of the hindwing is grey.

References

Micronoctuini
Moths described in 2010
Taxa named by Michael Fibiger